Jessica Helfand (born 1960 in Philadelphia, Pennsylvania) is a designer, author, and educator. She is a former contributing editor and columnist for Print, Eye and Communications Arts magazine, and founding editor of the website Design Observer. She is Senior Critic at Yale School of Art since 1994, a lecturer in Yale College, and Artist-in-Residence at Yale’s Institute for Network Science. Named the first Henry Wolf Resident in design at the American Academy in Rome in 2010, she is a member of the Alliance Graphique Internationale and the Art Director’s Hall of Fame. In 2013, she won the AIGA medal.

Education and career
Jessica Helfand is a 1978 high school graduate of George School in Newtown, Pennsylvania. She received both her BA in 1982 in Graphic Design and Architectural Theory and her MFA in 1989 in Graphic Design from Yale University. Following her graduation in 1982, she briefly wrote soap operas for Procter & Gamble, and eventually became junior scriptwriter on CBS’s Guiding Light. After completing her MFA  in 1989, she was appointed Design Director for the Philadelphia Inquirer Magazine.

For more than twenty years she taught at Yale University, where she was  Senior Critic in Graphic Design, the Artist in Residence at the Yale Institute for Network Science, and a lecturer in Yale College, where she taught the freshman seminars "Studies in Visual Biography" and "Blue". She has been visiting professor at Wesleyan University and Paris College of Art, and with Andrew Howard and Hamish Muir is a co-founder of the summer editorial course in Porto, Portugal. In 2019, she was appointed as a visiting professor at the University of Hertfordshire in the UK.

Helfand and her late partner William Drenttel founded Winterhouse Studio in 1997. In 2003, along with Michael Bierut and Rick Poynor, they launched the Design Observer blog and website. Helfand and Bierut are co-hosts of the podcast Observatory, which is hosted by Design Observer. And in 2016, launched a second podcast, The Design of Business | The Business of Design, which spawned an annual conference by the same name.  Fortune Senior Editor Ellen McGirt took over as the show's new cohost in the fall of 2019.

Helfand has written for many national publications, including the Los Angeles Times Book Review, Aperture, and The New Republic. She is the author of numerous books on design and cultural criticism, including Paul Rand: American Modernist (1998), Screen: Essays on Graphic Design, New Media and Visual Culture (2001) and Reinventing the Wheel (2002), which formed the basis for an exhibit in 2004 at the Grolier Club in New York City. Her critically acclaimed Scrapbooks: An American History (Yale University Press, 2008) was named "the best of this year’s gift books" by The New York Times. Design: The Invention of Desire, was published in 2016 by Yale University Press. Culture is Not Always Popular, a fifteen-year anthology of Design Observer, was co-edited by Michael Bierut and Jarrett Fuller, and was published by MIT Press in 2018. Helfand's most recent book—Face: A Visual Odysseywas published in 2019 by MIT Press.

Helfand was appointed by the Postmaster General to the U.S. Citizens Stamp Advisory Committee in 2006, where she chaired the Design Subcommittee until 2012. She is a member of the Alliance Graphique Internationale (AGI) the Art Directors Club Hall of Fame and with William Drenttel, held the first Henry Wolf Residency in Design at the American Academy in Rome in 2010. Helfand and Drenttel were each honoured with AIGA medal in 2013. 

A 2018 Director’s Guest at Civitella Ranieri and a 2019 fellow at the Bogliasco Foundation, Jessica Helfand is the winter 2020 Artist in Residence at the California Institute of Technology.

Helfand is the daughter of collector William H. Helfand.

Books by Jessica Helfand 
 Face: A Visual Odyssey, MIT Press.
 Culture is Not Always Popular, with Michael Bierut, MIT Press.
 Design: The Invention of Desire, Yale University Press.
 Scrapbooks: An American History, Yale University Press.
 Screen: Essays on Graphic Design, New Media, and Visual Culture, with John Maeda, Princeton Architectural Press.
 Reinventing the Wheel, Princeton Architectural Press.
 Looking Closer 3, Vol. 3: Classic Writings on Graphic Design with Michael Bierut, Steven Heller and Rick Poynor, Allworth Press.
 Paul Rand: American Modernist, William Drenttel Editions.
 Graphic Design America 2: The work of many of the best and brightest design firms from across the United States, with DK Holland and Chip Kidd, Rockport Publishers.

See also
 First Things First 2000 manifesto

References

External links
 Jessica Helfand 
 Interview with Madame Architect  
 Short biography from Yale University School of Art
 Articles by Jessica Helfand on Design Observer
 Winterhouse Institute
 Emigre 51: First Things First, 1999

AIGA medalists
American graphic designers
Women graphic designers
Design writers
Living people
1960 births
Yale University alumni
Yale University faculty
People from Philadelphia
George School alumni